Fortunato Rafael Roncagliolo de Orbegoso (14 November 1944 – 1 May 2021) was a Peruvian sociologist, diplomat, and politician. He served as Minister of Foreign Affairs under President Ollanta Humala from 28 July 2011 until he resigned on 14 May 2013, after the diplomatic crisis with Venezuela and the government of Nicolás Maduro.He later served as Ambassador to Spain from 2015 to 2016. He died on 1 May 2021 from COVID-19.

Biography 
He was born in Lima on November 14, 1944, he is the son of Nicolás Roncagliolo Aste and Susana de Orbegoso Pimentel (great-granddaughter of Marshal Luis José de Orbegoso, president of Peru). His father, a small landowner from the south, was mayor of Nazca (1945-1947; 1964–1966).

In 1972, he married Catalina Lohmann Luca de Tena, daughter of the historian and diplomat Guillermo Lohmann and granddaughter of Juan Ignacio Luca de Tena, Marquis of Luca de Tena. His children are Inés, Tania and the writer Santiago Roncagliolo.

He studied at the Colegio de la Inmaculada and at the Pontifical Catholic University of Peru, where he graduated with a bachelor's degree in Social Sciences (1969) and a degree in sociology (1970). During his stay at said university, he was an instructor of Spanish (1962) and auxiliary professor of sociology (1966) at the Faculty of Letters, and, in addition, president of the Federation of Students (Fepucp) in 1965.

Political career

Public administration 
Roncagliolo participated in different entities of the Peruvian public administration: Advisory Councils of the Presidency of the Council of Ministers, the Ministry of Education, the Ministry of Housing, the National Council of Science and Technology, the National Institute of Culture and the National Institute of Planning .

Minister of Foreign Affairs 
On July 20, 2011, it was announced that he will be the Foreign Affairs Minister of the new government of Ollanta Humala as of July 28, replacing José Antonio García Belaúnde.

In the exercise of this position, Roncagliolo proposed to implement an active diplomacy projecting outwards the sum of the different internal sectoral policies and in coherence with a policy of social inclusion, taking into account that Peru is interconnected and inserted in the globalized world where economic and political crises affect all countries.

Personal life 
He was the father of the author Santiago Roncagliolo.

References

2021 deaths
1944 births
Foreign ministers of Peru
Ambassadors of Peru to Spain
Peruvian diplomats
Peruvian sociologists
Pontifical Catholic University of Peru alumni
Academic staff of the National University of San Marcos
Academic staff of the University of Lima
Academic staff of the Panamerican University
Academic staff of the Pontifical Catholic University of Ecuador
Academic staff of the Pontifical Catholic University of Peru
Peruvian people of Italian descent
People from Lima
Deaths from the COVID-19 pandemic in Peru